Parappukkara  is a village in Thrissur district in the state of Kerala, India.

Demographics
 India census, Parappukkara had a population of 26641 with 12961 males and 13680 females. The population density is 1210.

References

Villages in Mukundapuram Taluk